A Historic marker is an "Alamo"-shaped plaque affixed to the top of a pole and erected next to a significant historic site, battlefield or county courthouse. In the state of Georgia there are roughly 2,000 historic markers.   Kevin Levin of the Smithsonian magazine said of the erected signs, "Historical markers are a ubiquitous presence along many of the nation's highways and country roads. You can spot their distinctive lettering, background color, and shape without even realizing what they commemorate."

Historic marker organizations and initiatives 
Georgia Historical Commission is the first organization commissioned to erect markers. The GHC has since been dissembled and beginning in 1998 the Georgia Historical Society took charge of the marker program. However, numerous organizations, such as local garden clubs, Daughters of the American Revolution, etc, are responsible for erecting others markers.

Georgia Historical Society 
In 1998 the Georgia Historical Society took over administration of Georgia’s historical marker and have since added 250 new historical markers.  Each marker varies in content, however, the Georgia Historical Society has "introduced several special initiatives to develop markers that offer more inclusive views of state history."

Historical markers for Confederate monument preservation 
The City of Atlanta announced the intention to add interpretive additions to historic markers, in order to bring about more depth to already erected Confederate Monuments. The plan was an alternative to removing the monuments which were, at one time, considered culturally and politically divisive. While the desire to preserve historical markers is, in itself, a deterrent against removal, it is also against state law to remove a Confederate monument.

Civil War initiative 
In the 1950s the state of Georgia launched the official Georgia Historical Commission to erect markers in preparation of the centennial anniversary of the Civil War. Most markers, such as The March to the Sea markers, described troop movements, battles, and accounts of William T. Sherman's Union campaign through Georgia.

Gallery

Historic marker locations 

Historic markers can be located by exact GPS location.

A "county" marker can be found at every county courthouse in all 159 counties in Georgia. Each marker roughly tells how and when the county was formed and who the founding officials were.

Blue Star Memorial Highway markers can be found at every rest stop on I-75, and other places.

Searching for historic markers 
Most markers can be found by searching on the Georgia Historical Society's "Marker Index" Page. Missing or damaged markers are maintained by the Georgia Historical Society. If a historical marker is found to be missing or damaged, it can be reported to GHS on their "Report a Missing or Damaged Marker" page.

References 

Historical markers in the United States